San Diego State University Press (or SDSU Press) is a university press that is part of San Diego State University, with noted specializations in Border Studies, Critical Theory, Latin American Studies,  Cultural Studies, and comics.  It is the oldest university press in the California State University system. It presently publishes books under two rubrics: CODEX, focused on critical theory, and surTEXT, focused on Latin American/Transamerican Cultural Studies. In 2006, SDSU Press also inaugurated Hyperbole Books, specializing in "publishing cutting-edge, over-the-top experiments in critical theory, literary criticism and graphic narrative."

Noted authors published by SDSU Press include Ralph R. Greenson, Daniel Olivas, Frederick Luis Aldama, Ilan Stavans,  Raymond Federman, Daniel Olivas, Jane Goodall, Noam Chomsky, and Mark Amerika.

SDSU Press is currently directed by Professor William Nericcio, and guided by an internal Board of Editors including Professors Stuart Aitken, Norma Bourchard, Paul Ganster, Yetta Howard, Roberto D. Hernandez, Joseph Thomas, & Jessica Pressman. Its editorial content is also guided by an External Board of Editors that includes Frederick Luis Aldama, Arts and Humanities Distinguished Professor of English, The Ohio State University; Arturo J. Aldama, Associate Chair/Professor, Ethnic Studies, The University of Colorado, Boulder; Norma Elia Cantú, Murchison Professor of the Humanities, Trinity University, San Antonio, Texas; Josh Kun, USC Annenberg School of Communications & Journalism, Associate Professor, Communications, The University of Southern California; María Josefina Saldaña-Portillo, Professor of Social and Cultural Analysis, New York University; Ryan Schneider, Associate Professor of English, Purdue University; Ramon Rivera-Servera, Associate Professor and Chair, Performance Studies, Weinberg College of Arts and Sciences, Northwestern University.

Former Directors and members of the Board of Editors include Larry McCaffery; Harry Polkinhorn, Professor Emeritus/ Press Director Emeritus; and Gloria Anzaldúa, External Editorial Board Member Emerita, Writer, Santa Cruz, CA.

See also

 List of English-language book publishing companies
 List of university presses

References

External links

Press
University presses of the United States
Book publishing companies based in California